is a Japanese voice actress affiliated with I'm Enterprise, which she joined in April 2013. Ozawa decided to become a voice actress after becoming a fan of Negima! during her seventh grade. She played her first leading role as Chiyo Sakura in Monthly Girls' Nozaki-kun.

Filmography

TV anime
2013
Monogatari Series: Second Season as Waitress
Ro-Kyu-Bu! SS as Wakana Kitano
Samurai Flamenco as Woman B

2014
Girl Friend Beta as Rhythmic Gymnastics staff B
I Can't Understand What My Husband Is Saying as Kaoru's Coworker
Invaders of the Rokujyōma!? as Female Student
Is the Order a Rabbit? as Schoolgirl A
Laughing Under the Clouds as Familiar, Kanbayashi's son, Tenka Kumo (young)
M3 the dark metal as Girl A
Monthly Girls' Nozaki-kun as Chiyo Sakura
No-Rin as Announcer
Noragami as Tsuguha
Sabagebu! as Club President, Elementary Student, Female College Student, Female Student, Girl, Woman
Your Lie in April as Nashida, Komugi
Yuki Yuna is a Hero as Classmate

2015
Aquarion Logos as Karan Uminagi
Classroom Crisis as Mizuki Sera
Doraemon as Girl, Woman B
Etotama as Umatan
High School DxD BorN as Millicas Gremory
Jewelpet: Magical Change as Airi Kirara
Komori-san Can't Decline as Megumi Nishitori
Lance N' Masques as Makio Kidōin
Maria the Virgin Witch as Cat, Regulis
Mikagura School Suite as Otone Fujishiro
Monster Musume as Papi
My Love Story!! as Kojima
Noragami Aragato as Tsuguha
The Rolling Girls as Nozomi Moritomo
Wakaba Girl as Wakaba Kohashi
Wish Upon the Pleiades as Rin, Miri
World Break: Aria of Curse for a Holy Swordsman as Child
School-Live! as Kurumi Ebisuzawa
The Asterisk War as Kirin Todo

2016
Active Raid as Asami Kazari
Bubuki Buranki as Kogane Asabuki
Flying Witch as Aru
High School Fleet as Runa Suruga
Magic of Stella as Ayame Seki
Pandora in the Crimson Shell: Ghost Urn as Maid
The Asterisk War 2nd Season as Kirin Todo
This Art Club Has a Problem! as Mizuki Usami
Undefeated Bahamut Chronicle as Airi Arcadia
WWW.Working!! as Rui Nagata

2017
Aikatsu Stars! as Suzu
Akashic Records of Bastard Magic Instructor as Re=L Rayford
ID-0 as Fa-Loser
Land of the Lustrous as Benitoite

2018
BanG Dream! Girls Band Party! Pico as Hina Hikawa
Caligula as Naruko Morita
Hinamatsuri as Mao
Märchen Mädchen as Tatiana Boyarskii
Mr. Tonegawa: Middle Management Blues as Zawa Voice (004)
Pastel Life as Hina Hikawa
Tada Never Falls in Love as Nyanko Big
Record of Grancrest War as Cammy
The Seven Heavenly Virtues as Metatron
Oshiete Mahou no Pendulum ~Rilu Rilu Fairilu~ as Spica

2019
BanG Dream! 2nd Season as Hina Hikawa
Demon Slayer: Kimetsu no Yaiba as Nichika Ubuyashiki
Endro! as Fai Fai
Kaguya-sama: Love is War as Moeha Fujiwara
Nobunaga Teacher's Young Bride as Ikoma Kitsuno
Re:Stage! Dream Days♪ as Yukari Itsumura
Special 7: Special Crime Investigation Unit as Bellemer "Ninja" Cinq
The Promised Neverland as Conny
YU-NO: A Girl Who Chants Love at the Bound of this World as Yuno

2020
BanG Dream! 3rd Season as Hina Hikawa
BanG Dream! Girls Band Party! Pico: Ohmori as Hina Hikawa
Kaguya-sama: Love is War 2nd Season as Moeha Fujiwara
Kakushigoto as Silvia Kobu
King's Raid: Successors of the Will as Cleo
Plunderer as Lynn May
Sleepy Princess in the Demon Castle as Sakkyun (Bussy) 

2021
Back Arrow as Elsha Lean
BanG Dream! Girls Band Party! Pico Fever! as Hina Hikawa
I've Been Killing Slimes for 300 Years and Maxed Out My Level as Vania
Keroro Shima as Keroro
Let's Make a Mug Too: Second Kiln as Himena Tokikawa

2022
Chiikawa as Usagi
Extreme Hearts as Lise Kohinata
She Professed Herself Pupil of the Wise Man as Meilin
Kaguya-sama: Love is War 3rd Season as Moeha Fujiwara

Original net animation (ONA)
Ore no Imōto ga Konna ni Kawaii Wake ga Nai. (2013) as Game voice
Comical Psychosomatic Medicine (2015) as Woman B, Nekomimi maid, Schoolgirl, Psychotherapist A
Robot Girls Z+ (2015) as Gai no Jō
Bastard!! -Heavy Metal, Dark Fantasy- (2022) as Sean Ari

Original video animation (OVA)
The Comic Artist and His Assistants as Friend
Zephyr as Girl 3
Noragami Aragato (2015) as Tsuguha
One-Punch Man (2016) as Lily of the Three Section Staff

Video games
Azur Lane as 
Grand Chase Dimensional Chaser Global as Mari Ming Ornette
Shirohime Quest as Odawara, Kasugayama, Kanazawa, Matsumoto, Yamagata
Dream C Club Gogo. as Anju
Age of Ishtaria as Metatron and Alkha
Makai Shin Trillion as Elma
Rainbow Run Girls as Ichinose Ai
Granblue Fantasy as Sarya
Closers (2017) as Levia
Xenoblade Chronicles 2 (2017) as Rinne
BanG Dream! Girls Band Party! as Hina Hikawa
Sword Art Online: Integral Factor as Koharu
Alice Gear Aegis as Ayaka Ichijō
King's Raid as Cleo
Fire Emblem Heroes as Lilina, Serra, Fae
Magia Record: Puella Magi Madoka Magica Side Story (2017) as Ayaka Mariko
Kirara Fantasia as Kurumi Ebisuzawa
Onsen Musume: Yunohana Collection as Rikka Ureshino
Ash Arms as Jadgpanther
Genshin Impact as Xiangling
Alchemy Stars as Bonacie
Cookie Run: Kingdom as Princess Cookie
Blue Archive as Mari Iochi
Fate Grand Order as Iyo

Films
Pop in Q (2016) as Asahi Ōmichi
BanG Dream! Film Live (2019) as Hina Hikawa
High School Fleet: The Movie (2020) as Runa Suruga
BanG Dream! Episode of Roselia (2021) as Hina Hikawa
BanG Dream! Film Live 2nd Stage (2021) as Hina Hikawa

Podcasts
NAGAKING!! (2016–17), WWW.Working!!-based podcast

References

External links
 
 at I'm Enterprise 

1992 births
Living people
Voice actresses from Tokyo
Japanese voice actresses
21st-century Japanese actresses
I'm Enterprise voice actors